The 2013–14 Moldovan Women Top League season in association football is the 14th since its establishment. A total of 7 teams contested the league. One team though was excluded after two matchdays. No matches were kept in the standings. Another one withdrew voluntarily during the season. Their results were kept and subsequent matches awarded as 3–0 losses.

The season began on 8 September 2013 and ended on 25 May 2014. Goliador Chişinău were the defending champions.

Teams

Format
Team play each other three times for a total of 15 matches each.

League table
CS Moldova Mîndreşti voluntarily withdrew after eight matches. Results were kept in the table and following matches were awarded.

Source: Moldovan Football Federation

References

External links
Women Top League - Moldova - Results, fixtures, tables and news - FMF
League at uefa.com

Moldovan Women Top League seasons
Moldovan Women Top League 2013-14
2013–14 domestic women's association football leagues